Allium tripedale is a species of wild onion native to the Caucasus (North + South), Iraq, Turkey, and northern Iran. It is related to Allium siculum. It produces up to 30 pink-violet bell-shaped flowers per umbel.

References

tripedale
Onions
Flora of the Caucasus
Plants described in 1873